Ivan Smith (31 December 1933 – 9 December 2020) was an Australian rules footballer who played with Fitzroy in the Victorian Football League (VFL).

Notes

External links 
		

1933 births
2020 deaths
Australian rules footballers from Victoria (Australia)
Fitzroy Football Club players